The solar eclipse of January 6, 2019 was a partial solar eclipse that was visible in East Asia and the North Pacific.

Visibility 
The maximal phase (71%) of the partial eclipse was recorded in Sakha Republic (Russia).

The eclipse was observed in Japan, the Russian Far East, North and South Korea, eastern China, eastern Mongolia and northwest Alaska.

Gallery

Related eclipses

Eclipses of 2019 
 A partial solar eclipse on January 6.
 A total lunar eclipse on January 21.
 A total solar eclipse on July 2.
 A partial lunar eclipse on July 16.
 An annular solar eclipse on December 26.

Tzolkinex 
 Preceded: Solar eclipse of November 25, 2011

 Followed: Solar eclipse of February 17, 2026

Half-Saros cycle 
 Preceded: Lunar eclipse of December 31, 2009

 Followed: Lunar eclipse of January 12, 2028

Tritos 
 Preceded: Solar eclipse of February 7, 2008

 Followed: Solar eclipse of December 5, 2029

Solar Saros 122 
 Preceded: Solar eclipse of December 25, 2000

 Followed: Solar eclipse of January 16, 2037

Inex 
 Preceded: Solar eclipse of January 26, 1990

 Followed: Solar eclipse of December 16, 2047

Triad 
 Preceded: Solar eclipse of March 7, 1932

 Followed: Solar eclipse of November 6, 2105

Solar eclipses of 2018–2021

Metonic series

References

External links 
 http://eclipse.gsfc.nasa.gov/SEplot/SEplot2001/SE2019Jan06P.GIF

2019 in science
2019 1 6
January 2019 events